The 1995 Volta a Catalunya was the 75th edition of the Volta a Catalunya cycle race and was held from 15 June to 22 June 1995. The race started in Manlleu and finished in Olot. The race was won by Laurent Jalabert of the ONCE team.

Teams

Sixteen teams of up to eight riders took part in the race:

Route

General classification

References

Further reading

1995
Volta
1995 in Spanish road cycling
June 1995 sports events in Europe